Nelson Creek is a stream in Henry County in the U.S. state of Missouri. It is a tributary to Tebo Creek.

Nelson Creek has the name of a pioneer citizen.

See also
List of rivers of Missouri

References

Rivers of Henry County, Missouri
Rivers of Missouri